Pașcani is a city in Iași County in the Western Moldavia region of Romania, on the Siret river. , it has a population of 33,745. Five villages are administered by the city: Blăgești, Boșteni, Gâstești, Lunca, and Sodomeni.

The city derived its name from the estate of the boyar Oană Pașca. It is the city where Mihail Sadoveanu's novel The Place Where Nothing Happened takes place. An important local site is the Church of the Holy Archangels.

Pașcani is a key node in the Căile Ferate Române rail network; its train station serves the CFR main lines 500 and 600.

Natives
 Octavian Nemescu
 Visarion Puiu
 Neculai Rățoi
 Mihail Sadoveanu
 Ion Vasilenco

References

External links

 http://www.primariapascani.ro/

 
Cities in Romania
Populated places in Iași County
Localities in Western Moldavia
Monotowns in Romania